Claire-Marie Mazarelli, marquise de la Vieuville de Saint-Chamond (born 1731 in Paris) was an 18th-century French woman of letters.

Biography 
The daughter of Angel Mazarelli, citizen of the city of Paris from Italy, and Marie-Catherine Mathée, she must defend in court in 1750 against accusations about her birth and manners.

By contract from 1 June 1765, she married in Paris Charles-Louis-Auguste de Vieuville, Marquis de Saint-Chamond, Count of Vienne and Confolens, first Baron of Lyonnais who was a colonel-owner of an infantry regiment. They had a son also named Charles-Louis-Auguste, born 6 June 1766.

Publications 
 Letter to Jean-Jacques Rousseau, 1762
 
 Éloge de René Descartes, 1765

Bibliography

References

External links 
 Claire-Marie Mazarelli de Saint-Chamond on data.bnf.fr

18th-century French writers
18th-century French dramatists and playwrights
18th-century French women writers
French women dramatists and playwrights
1731 births
Year of death unknown
Writers from Paris
Date of death unknown